"I Wanna Be the One" is a song by American freestyle artist, Stevie B, released as the lead single from his album, In My Eyes, from 1989. The tune became Stevie B.'s first American top-40 hit, peaking at number 32 in early 1989.

Track listings
 7" single

 12" single

Charts

References

1989 singles
Stevie B songs
1988 songs